The following is a list of the television networks and announcers who have broadcast college football's Hawaii Bowl throughout the years.

Television

Radio

References

External links 
Bowls: Hawaii Bowl Earns Second-Highest Rating

Hawaii
Broadcasters
Hawaii Bowl
Hawaii Bowl
Hawaii sports-related lists